Tarantulas are a group of hairy and often very large spiders belonging to the family Theraphosidae.

Tarantula may also refer to:

Fiction
 Tarantulas (Transformers), a character in Beast Wars: Transformers
 Tarantula (Dylan book), a book of poetry by Bob Dylan
 Tarantula (novel), a crime novel by Thierry Jonquet
 Tarantula (DC Comics), the name of two different characters from DC Comics
 Tarantula (Marvel Comics), the name of a number of villains from Marvel Comics

Film
 The Tarantula, a 1913 silent film
 The Tarantula, a 1916 silent film
 Tarantula (film), a 1955 science fiction film directed by Jack Arnold
 Tarantula (TV series), an American animated television series
 Tarantulas: The Deadly Cargo

Music
 The Tarantulas, a surf guitar band
 Tarantula (band), a Portuguese heavy metal band
 Tarantulas Records, a record label

Albums
 Tarantula (Riverdales album)
 Tarantula (Ride album)
 Tarantula (Mystikal album)
 Tarántula, an album by Mónica Naranjo
 Tarantula (Flickerstick album)
 Tarantula (Tarantula album), 1987

Songs
 "Tarantula" (Faithless song)
 "Tarantula" (The Smashing Pumpkins song)
 "Tarantula" (Mystikal song)
 "Tarantula", a 1982 song by Colourbox
 "Tarantula", a 1986 song by This Mortal Coil from Filigree & Shadow
 "Tarantula / Fasten Your Seatbelt", a song by drum & bass band Pendulum
 "Tarantula", a song by The Aquabats, on the album The Return of The Aquabats
 "Tarantula", a song by Bob Schneider, on the album Lovely Creatures
 "Tarantula", a song by Gorillaz, on the album Cracker Island.

Other uses
 Tarantula Nebula (NGC 2070), an H II region in the Large Magellanic Cloud (LMC)
USS Tarantula (SP-124), a World War I patrol boat

See also
 Atypical tarantula, spiders of the family Atypidae
 Dwarf tarantula, spiders of the family Mecicobothriidae
 Lycosa tarantula, a species of spider native to Taranto, Italy
 Tarantella, a traditional dance associated with the spider